The common name worm-snail (or worm snail, wormsnail, or worm shell) applies to a family and several species of gastropod:
Vermetidae (family)
Dendropoma corallinaceum
Thylacodes (genus)
Thylacodes aotearoicus
Thylacodes natalensis
Thylacodes squamigerus
Thylacodes zelandicus
Vermicularia knorrii (common name Florida worm snail)

Animal common name disambiguation pages